The 47D Drake (often abbreviated as the 47D) was a PCC trolley line that was part of the Pittsburgh Light Rail system.

History
The 47D was the last line in the city of Pittsburgh, Pennsylvania to use PCC streetcars. It originally was part of an  interurban trolley line that ran from Pittsburgh to Washington, PA until 1953, when the service was cut back to the Allegheny County border at Drake and all trolleys turned using the newly constructed loop, situated below the trestle. The line was designated as 36 Shannon-Drake by Pittsburgh Railways, and with the Stage I reconstruction in the early 1980's, the route was re-designated as 47D Drake via Overbrook. After the 1993 closure of the Overbrook route the service became a shuttle between Castle Shannon and Drake and was renumbered 47D Drake shuttle, and continued to operate as such until closed on September 4, 1999. Port Authority's Stage II reconstruction plan had originally included rebuilding the Drake line as well as the Overbrook and Library lines, however, only the Overbrook and small portions of the Library line have currently been rebuilt, and it remains unknown if or when the Drake line will be rebuilt.

Much of the Drake line, as it was when shut down, still exists, albeit in derelict condition.  The stretch of track from the Drake Loop to the "S" curve near the former Walthers stop was removed not long after the line was discontinued in 1999. When Port Authority of Allegheny County took delivery of new LRVs for use on the rebuilt Overbrook line in 2004, the new cars were tested on the Drake line prior to entering revenue service. Power wire beyond Fort Couch Road to the end of the line were removed at some point after, however the segment between there and Dorchester where the South Hills Village spur joins the Drake Line is still maintained and powered, and the tunnel beneath Fort Couch Road is occasionally used for storing non-revenue rail vehicles.

Fleet

During the final years of operation, three PCCs were used with a fourth kept as reserve. Car #4004 was donated to the Pennsylvania Trolley Museum where it has become part of a collection of historic streetcars and trolleys from all across the United States and other nations. The San Francisco Municipal Railway (Muni) acquired #4008 and #4009 in an internet auction in 2002 for $5,000 each. However, they needed to be re-gauged and differ significantly from other PCCs in that agency's fleet, and were ultimately scrapped in 2019.

References

Port Authority of Allegheny County
Railway services discontinued in 1999